Langbein is a surname of German origin, meaning "long leg", and may refer to:

Annabel Langbein (born 1958), New Zealand celebrity cook, food writer and publisher
August Friedrich Ernst Langbein (1757–1835), German humoristic writer
Brenton Langbein (1928–1993), Australian violinist, conductor, and composer
Dieter Langbein (1932–2004), German physicist
Fritz Langbein (1891–1967), New Zealand civil engineer
George F. Langbein (1842–1911), New York politician
Hermann Langbein (1912-1995), Austrian who fought in the Spanish Civil War with the International Brigades
J. C. Julius Langbein (1846–1910), New York politician and judge
John H. Langbein (born 1941), Sterling Professor of Law and Legal History at Yale Law School
Laura Langbein, American political scientist
Martha Langbein (born 1941), German athlete